Diabotical is a 2020 multiplayer-only first-person shooter developed by Swedish team GD Studio. It is in the arena FPS genre and features gameplay similar to Quake III Arena and its successors, with a variety of game modes, weapons, and complex movement mechanics. Diabotical uses an engine written from scratch, the "Glitch Engine".

The game entered closed beta on 28 February 2020, with a full release on 3 September 2020. The game is free to play, and $250000 have been set aside for esport competitions in the game's first year.

References

External links
 

2020 video games
Esports games
First-person shooters
Video games developed in Sweden
Windows games
Windows-only games